Fin Rural District is a rural district (dehestan) in the Fin District of Bandar Abbas County, Hormozgan Province, Iran. At the 2006 census, its population was 9,277, in 2,065 families.  The rural district has 50 villages and is also home to the centuries-old Fin Castle.

References 

Rural Districts of Hormozgan Province
Bandar Abbas County